In Greek mythology, Hermippe (Ancient Greek: Ἑρμίππη) was a daughter of Boeotus. She was married to Orchomenus, son of Zeus and the Danaid Isonoe, but had a son Minyas with Poseidon. Orchomenus became legal father of her son.

The IAU Gazetteer of Planetary Nomenclature refers to Hermippe as "Consort of Zeus and mother of Orchomenos by him", apparently following an alternate version recorded by scholiasts on Homer.

Notes

References 

 Apollonius Rhodius, Argonautica translated by Robert Cooper Seaton (1853-1915), R. C. Loeb Classical Library Volume 001. London, William Heinemann Ltd, 1912. Online version at the Topos Text Project.
 Apollonius Rhodius, Argonautica. George W. Mooney. London. Longmans, Green. 1912. Greek text available at the Perseus Digital Library.
 Homer, The Iliad with an English Translation by A.T. Murray, Ph.D. in two volumes. Cambridge, MA., Harvard University Press; London, William Heinemann, Ltd. 1924. . Online version at the Perseus Digital Library.
 Homer, Homeri Opera in five volumes. Oxford, Oxford University Press. 1920. . Greek text available at the Perseus Digital Library.

Women in Greek mythology
Mortal parents of demigods in classical mythology